The Albanian Futsal Premier League is the main  futsal league in Albania. It was founded in 2003 and FK Tirana are the most successful team with 10 titles won.

Seasons

Champions

FK Tirana   10 times

Flamurtari Vlorë     4 times

KS Ali Demi              2 times

KS Edro Vlora                  1 time

Dinamo Tirana                  1 time

Participating teams 2021–22
Futsal Klub Tirana
Diamant Futsal
Flamurtari Vlorë
Elbasani Futsal

See also
 Albanian Futsal Cup
 Nationwide Futsal Cup

References

External links
futsalplanet.com (current season)

 
Top level futsal leagues in Europe
Sports leagues established in 2003
2003 establishments in Albania
Futsal